Pregnesia is a romantic suspense novel by American author Carla Cassidy.

Plot
Former Navy SEAL Lucas Washington was an expert at tackling impossible missions. But when a striking and pregnant woman turned up in a car he was repossessing, suddenly he was in over his head. Shaken and bruised, she couldn't remember what had happened to her or why she was terrified of going to the police. Lucas made it clear he could be trusted, and vowed to protect her until she was safe. They searched for clues to her hidden past and  then a family comes to find her, which starts the novel.

References

2009 American novels